Milan is a town in Coös County, New Hampshire, United States. The population was 1,358 at the 2020 census. It is part of the Berlin, NH–VT Micropolitan Statistical Area.

History 

Originally named "Paulsburg" in 1771 after Paul Wentworth, the town was incorporated on December 16, 1824. In that year, Governor Levi Woodbury authorized a name change to "Milan". 

Prior to 1820 there were but few inhabitants. In 1819 the population was about fourteen; ten years passed and the number had increased four-fold.   Like the other towns around it, Milan's first industries were lumbering operations, and agriculture was for some time subordinate to this. The first farms were developed on Milan Hill. The soil was warmer, more free from frost, and, for some years, produced quite liberally in response to the labors of the pioneers. But they were not permanently as productive as they gave promise, and many of those settlers who remained south the most valuable lands along the river. Some of the names of the early pioneers of Milan include Ellingwood, Hodgdon, Fogg, Hinds, Roberts, Hagar, Sargent, Nay, Twitchell, and Newell.

Geography 

The town of Milan is bordered by Berlin to the south, Kilkenny and Stark to the west, Success to the east, and Dummer and Cambridge to the north.

Demographics 

As of the census of 2000, there were 1,331 people, 532 households, and 388 families residing in the town. The population density was 21.6 people per square mile (8.3/km2). There were 756 housing units at an average density of 12.2 per square mile (4.7/km2). The racial makeup of the town was 98.95% White, 0.08% African American, 0.30% Native American, 0.08% Asian, 0.23% from other races, and 0.38% from two or more races.

There were 532 households, out of which 31.8% had children under the age of 18 living with them, 62.4% were married couples living together, 5.5% had a female householder with no husband present, and 26.9% were non-families. 21.4% of all households were made up of individuals, and 7.9% had someone living alone who was 65 years of age or older. The average household size was 2.50 and the average family size was 2.92.

In the town, the population was spread out, with 25.8% under the age of 18, 3.7% from 18 to 24, 29.8% from 25 to 44, 28.5% from 45 to 64, and 12.3% who were 65 years of age or older. The median age was 41 years. For every 100 females, there were 105.1 males. For every 100 females age 18 and over, there were 107.1 males.

The median income for a household in the town was $40,966, and the median income for a family was $47,361. Males had a median income of $32,500 versus $20,670 for females. The per capita income for the town was $19,818. About 3.0% of families and 5.7% of the population were below the poverty line, including 7.0% of those under age 18 and 13.8% of those age 65 or over.

Sites of interest
 Nansen Ski Jump
 Milan Hill State Park

References

External links 
 
 New Hampshire Economic and Labor Market Information Bureau Milan page

Towns in Coös County, New Hampshire
Populated places established in 1824
Berlin, New Hampshire micropolitan area
Towns in New Hampshire